"No Stylist" is a song by French Montana featuring Drake. It was released on September 20, 2018. The song is a single on Montana's EP of the same name, which was released alongside the song. It was later added to Montana's third studio album Montana, which was released in December 2019.

Background
The song was previewed at the Tao Downtown Nightclub in New York City on August 21, 2018. In the song, Drake threw more shots at Kanye West by saying, "Yeah, keepin' it G, I told her "don't wear no 350s 'round me", referencing the Adidas sneaker, Adidas Yeezy.

Music video
The song's accompanying music video was released on October 9, 2018. It featured cameos from ASAP Rocky, Cam’ron, Dapper Dan, Young Thug, Luka Sabbat, and Slick Rick.

Charts

Weekly charts

Year-end charts

Certifications

Release history

References

2018 singles
2018 songs
Songs written by French Montana
Songs written by Drake (musician)
Drake (musician) songs
French Montana songs
Songs written by Christopher Dotson
Songs written by Felix Pappalardi
Songs written by Hitmaka
Songs written by Leslie West
Songs written by London on da Track
Song recordings produced by London on da Track
Epic Records singles
Trap music songs